D. S. MacGregor was the 24th Colonial Auditor. He was appointed on 8 April 1909, succeeding Bernard Senior, and held the office until 27 May 1914. He was succeeded by Wilfred Wentworth Woods.

References

Auditors General of Sri Lanka